COMPASS, short for Compact Assembly, is a compact tokamak fusion energy device originally completed at the Culham Science Centre in 1989, upgraded in 1992, and operated until 2002. It was designed as a flexible research facility dedicated mostly to plasma physics studies in circular and D-shaped plasmas.

When it was decommissioned at Culham, it was offered to the European Commission and found a new home at the Institute of Plasma Physics of the Czech Academy of Sciences in Prague where it began operations once again in 2006. It officially ended its experimental runs on 20 August 2021 and will be disassembled to leave room for a new device, COMPASS-U.

History 
The first plasma in COMPASS was produced in 1989 in a C-shaped vacuum vessel, i.e., in a simpler vessel with a circular cross-section. Pioneering experiments followed, including for example the ITER-relevant tests of magnetic field correction with saddle coils for Resonant magnetic perturbations (RMP) experiments or experiments with non-inductive current drive in plasma.

The operation of tokamak was restarted with a D-shaped vacuum vessel in 1992. The operation mode with high plasma confinement (H-mode) was achieved, which represents a reference operation ("standard scenario") for the ITER tokamak. The COMPASS tokamak is one of the smallest tokamaks able to operate in H-mode, with a major radius 0.6 m and height of approximately 0.7 m. Due to its size and shape, the COMPASS plasmas correspond to one tenth (in the linear scale) of the ITER plasmas. Besides COMPASS, there are only two operational tokamaks in Europe with ITER-like configuration capable of H-mode, the Joint European Torus (JET) at Culham and the ASDEX Upgrade at the Institut für Plasmaphysik in Garching, Germany.

In 2002, British scientists started alternative research on larger, spherical tokamak MAST. Operation of COMPASS was discontinued due to insufficient resources for the operation of both tokamaks, however, the planned research program was not complete. The European Commission and UKAEA sent COMPASS to the Institute of Plasma Physics in Prague in the autumn of 2004. The machine restarted operations in 2006 and operated continually until its last "shot" on 20 August 2021. During its operational time in Prague, COMPASS carried out 21,000 experimental shots.

, plans are to dispose of COMPASS to make way for a significantly larger machine, COMPASS-U (for Upgrade).

COMPASS and COMPASS-U

See also
 List of fusion experiments
 ELM (Edge Localized Mode)
 Ball-pen probe
 Langmuir probe
 Thomson scattering
 Resonant magnetic perturbations

References

External links

 Magnetic fusion in the Czech Republic
 Diagnostic system on COMPASS

https://iopscience.iop.org/article/10.1088/0741-3335/58/1/014015

Tokamaks
Nuclear technology in the Czech Republic